Melaleuca oxyphylla, commonly known as pointed-leaved honey-myrtle, is a plant in the myrtle family, Myrtaceae, and is endemic to the Eyre Peninsula region of South Australia. It has long, thin greyish branches, small clusters of white or cream flowers and leaves that are distinctively shaped and arranged. It is similar to Melaleuca acuminata but has longer, narrower leaves and shorter stamens.

Description 
Its leaves are covered with soft, silky hairs when young but become glabrous as they mature. They are crowded together in alternating pairs, each pair at right angles to the ones above and below, so that they form four rows along the branchlets (decussate).

The flowers are white to creamy yellow and are arranged in small heads between the leaves.

Taxonomy and naming
This species was first formally described in 1979 by John Carrick in Journal of the Adelaide Botanic Gardens from a specimen collected by David Symon in the Gawler Ranges, south-west of Yardea.  The specific epithet (oxyphylla) is from the Ancient Greek words ὀξύς (oksús) meaning “sharp” or "acute" and phýllon meaning “leaf”, referring to the sharp-tipped leaves.

Distribution and habitat
Melaleuca oxyphylla occurs in the Eyre Peninsula, mostly between Minnipa and Cowell growing along creeks in clay soils.

References

Flora of South Australia
oxyphylla
Myrtales of Australia
Plants described in 1979